Tatiana Alekseevna Kadochkina (born 21 March 2003) is a Russian volleyball player, who plays as an opposite hitter for the Russian club Dinamo Kazan.

Career
Kadochkina started playing volleyball in Nizhny Novgorod where she moved from Orenburg with her family in 2009. Her father Alexey Kadochkin is a former volleyball player and has been the sports director of the women’s volleyball team “Sparta” from Nizhny Novgorod since 2017.

Club career
In 2016/17 season, Kadochkina moved to Kazan to attend the Yekaterina Gamova School which was established there in July 2016. She began to play for Dinamo-UOR-School Gamova team, which is a part of the Dinamo Kazan club, in the Premier League B of the Russian Championship. In 2018, at the age of 15, she was transferred to the main team of the Dinamo Kazan club and almost from the beginning of the 2018/2019 season, she firmly took her place in the starting lineup of the team in the Russian Super League. In December 2018, she won her first medal at the senior level, becoming the bronze medalist of the Russian Cup.

National team
At the age of 14, Kadochkina was invited to join Russian squad for the 2017 Girls' U18 Volleyball European Championship where the Russian team was crowned as the European champion. A few months later, she won the silver medal at the inaugural Girls' U16 Volleyball European Championship and received the “most valuable player” award for the tournament. In August 2017, 14-year-old Kadochkina again called up for the U18 team, this time for the 2017 FIVB Volleyball Girls' U18 World Championship, and won the bronze medal.  She’s also the member of the Russian team that won the gold medal at the EEVZA (Eastern European Volleyball Zonal Association) U16 Championship in December and was selected as the “most valuable player” of the tournament. In 2018, Kadochkina joined the U19 team and won the silver medal at the 2018 Women's U19 Volleyball European Championship.

Awards

Individuals
 2017 Girls’ U16 Volleyball European Championship "Most Valuable Player"
 2017 EEVZA U16 Championship "Most Valuable Player"

Clubs
 2018 Russian Cup -  Bronze Medal, with Dinamo Kazan
 2019 Russian Cup -  Champion, with Dinamo Kazan
 2019–20 Russian Super League -  Champion, with Dinamo Kazan
 2020 Russian Super Cup -  Champion, with Dinamo Kazan
 2020 Russian Cup -  Champion, with Dinamo Kazan
 2020–21 Russian Super League -  Bronze Medal, with Dinamo Kazan
 2021 Russian Cup -  Champion, with Dinamo Kazan

National team

Junior team
 2017 Girls' U18 Volleyball European Championship -  Gold Medal
 2017 Girls' U16 Volleyball European Championship -  Silver Medal
 2017 FIVB Volleyball Girls' U18 World Championship -  Bronze Medal
 2017 EEVZA U16 Championship -  Gold Medal
 2018 Women's U19 Volleyball European Championship -  Silver Medal

References

External links
 Dinamo Kazan Profile
 Profile at CEV

2003 births
Living people
People from Orenburg
Sportspeople from Nizhny Novgorod
Russian women's volleyball players
21st-century Russian women